Kiryat Motzkin is a city in the Haifa District of Israel,  north of the city of Haifa. The city is named after Leo Motzkin (1867-1933), one of the organizers of the First Zionist Congress in 1897. The mayor of the city is Haim Zuri.

History

Kiryat Motzkin was founded in 1934, and by 1935 the first school was opened. In 1939, the town had a population of about 2,000 and 345 buildings. Kiryat Motzkin railway station was constructed by British Mandatory Palestine in 1937.

In the Second World War, Kiryat Motzkin suffered from German\Italian air bombarding.
It received local council status in 1940. 
 
During the 1947–48 Civil War in Mandatory Palestine, an important battle took place near Kiryat Motzkin when the Haganah destroyed an Arab arms convoy and killed the commander of Arab forces in the process. This contributed to the Jewish victory in the Battle of Haifa.

Demographics
According to CBS, in 2006 the ethnic makeup of the city was all Jewish and other non-Arabs. There were 18,800 males and 20,900 females, with 25.5% of the population 19 years of age or younger, 15.2% between 20 and 29, 19.0% between 30 and 44, 20.1% from 45 to 59, 4.5% from 60 to 64, and 15.9% 65 years of age or older. The population growth rate in 2006 was -0.1% and it grew to 39,590 in 2014.
The city is ranked medium-high on the socio-economic scale (7 out of 10)

Income
In 2005, there were 17,887 salaried workers and 978 self-employed. The mean monthly wage for a salaried worker was NIS 6,581, a real change of 0.6% over the course of 2004. Salaried males had a mean monthly wage of NIS 8,773 (a real change of 3.0%) compared to NIS 4,634 for females (a real change of -2.2%). The mean income for self-employed was 6,327. 437 people received unemployment benefits, and 2,157 received an income supplement.

Education
There are 12 schools and 6,071 students in Kiryat Motzkin, with 6 elementary schools (2,724  students) and 6 high schools (3,347 students). 58.4% of 12th-grade students were eligible for a matriculation certificate in 2006.

Transportation 
Kiryat Motzkin is served by Kiryat Motzkin Railway Station, which is on the main Coastal railway line to Nahariya, with southerly trains to Beersheba and Modi'in. The Krayot Central Bus Station is located on the northern edge of the municipality and serves as a terminus for the Metronit bus rapid transit system and local bus routes.

Twin towns – sister cities

Kiryat Motzkin is twinned with:

 Bad Kreuznach (district), Germany
 Bad Segeberg, Germany

 Haßberge (district), Germany
 Kaifeng, China
 Mariánské Lázně, Czech Republic
 Nyíregyháza, Hungary
 Orlando, United States
 Radzyń Podlaski County, Poland
 Włodawa County, Poland

Notable people

Yuval Avidor (born 1986), footballer
Ofir Mizrahi (born 1993), footballer
Shuki Schwartz (born 1954), basketball player
 Bar Soloveychik (born 2000), swimmer

References

External links

Official website
Satellite Image from Google Maps

Cities in Israel
Krayot
Cities in Haifa District
Populated places established in 1934
1934 establishments in Mandatory Palestine